Dry Creek is a  long 3rd order tributary to the Cape Fear River in Harnett County, North Carolina.

Course
Dry Creek rises about 4 miles north of Lillington, North Carolina and then follows a southerly course to join the Cape Fear River about 0.25 miles northeast of Lillington.

Watershed
Dry Creek drains  of area, receives about 46.1 in/year of precipitation, has a wetness index of 534.70 and is about 24% forested.

See also
List of rivers of North Carolina

References

Rivers of North Carolina
Rivers of Harnett County, North Carolina
Tributaries of the Cape Fear River